In 1948, Billboard magazine published two charts ranking the top-performing songs in the United States within rhythm and blues (R&B) and related African-American-oriented musical genres.  The Most Played Juke Box Race Records chart had been published since 1945; placings were based on a weekly survey among jukebox operators.  In May, the magazine added the Best Selling Retail Race Records listing, compiled based on a survey of record stores nationwide in which the majority of customers purchased what were then referred to as "race records".  The two charts are considered to be part of the lineage of the magazine's multimetric R&B chart, which since 2005 has been published under the title Hot R&B/Hip-Hop Songs.

In the issue of Billboard dated January 3, 1948, "(Opportunity Knocks But Once) Snatch and Grab It" by Julia Lee and her Boy Friends topped the jukebox chart.  The song occupied the top spot for eight of the first ten weeks of 1948, spending its final week at number one in the issue dated March 6; two weeks later, Lee returned to the top of the chart with the song "King Size Papa", which had a nine-week run at number one. Lee's 17 weeks atop the jukebox chart was the most achieved by any artist in 1948, but she would not achieve another number one and her final chart entry came in 1949.  In the May 22 issue, the first to feature the new best sellers chart, "Tomorrow Night" by Lonnie Johnson topped both listings.

In addition to Julia Lee, two other acts achieved two number ones in 1948.  Bandleader and pianist Sonny Thompson spent two non-consecutive weeks atop both listings with "Long Gone" (Parts I & II) between July and October, and one week atop each in October with "Late Freight".  The two records, both of which featured saxophonist Eddie Chamblee, were Thompson's first two chart entries, but he would never achieve another number one.  Bull Moose Jackson also achieved two chart-toppers, "I Love You Yes I Do" and "I Can't Go on Without You", but like Thompson he would not return to number one.  In December, two versions of the song "Bewildered" reached number one.  The Red Miller Trio topped the best sellers listing in the issue dated December 4 and the jukebox chart two weeks later.  In the December 25 issue Amos Milburn reached the top spot on the best sellers chart with his version, in the same week that his song "Chicken Shack Boogie" was at number one on the jukebox chart.  Despite the success of Miller's version of "Bewildered", it would prove to be the only charting song of his career and little is known about his life.  In June and July, Wynonie Harris topped both charts with "Good Rockin' Tonight"; the track was later recorded by Elvis Presley and is considered a historic precursor of rock and roll music.

Chart history

Notes
a.  Two songs tied for number one on the Juke Box chart.

References

Works cited

1948
1948 record charts
1948 in American music